New Right is a term for various right-wing political groups or policies in different countries during different periods. One prominent usage was to describe the emergence of certain Eastern European parties after the collapse of the Soviet Union. In the United States, the Second New Right campaigned against abortion, homosexuality, the Equal Rights Amendment (ERA), the Panama Canal Treaty, affirmative action, and most forms of taxation.

History 
New Right appeared during the 1964 presidential campaign of Barry Goldwater to designate the emergence, in response to American-style liberalism (i.e., social liberalism), of a more combative, anti-egalitarian, and uninhibited right. Popularized by Richard Viguerie, the term became later used to describe a broader movement in the English-speaking world: those proponents of the night-watchman state but who also tended to be socially conservative, such as Ronald Reagan, Margaret Thatcher, Turgut Özal, Augusto Pinochet or New Zealand First. However, as Jean-Yves Camus and Nicolas Lebourg point out, this leaning had only a few aspects in common with the "European New Right" that had been emerging since the 1960s, more inspired by the conservative revolutionary Moeller van den Bruck than by the classical liberal Adam Smith. Anarcho-capitalism, a form of libertarianism that advocates for the replacement of all state institutions with private institutions, is usually seen as part of the New Right.

New Right by country

Australia
In Australia, the New Right refers to a late 1970s/1980s onward movement both within and outside of the Liberal/National Coalition which advocates economically liberal and increased socially conservative policies (as opposed to the old right which advocated economically conservative policies and "small-l liberals" with more socially liberal views).  Unlike the United Kingdom and United States, but like neighbouring New Zealand, the 1980s saw the Australian Labor Party initiate Third Way economic reforms, which bear some familiarity to New Right ideology. After the John Howard Coalition ended the 13-year rule of the Hawke-Keating Labor government at the 1996 federal election, economic reforms were taken further, some examples being wholesale labor market deregulation (e.g., WorkChoices), the introduction of a Goods and Services Tax (GST), the privatisation of the telecommunications monopoly Telstra, and sweeping welfare reform including "work for the dole".  The H. R. Nicholls Society, a think tank which advocates full workplace deregulation, contains some Liberal MPs as members and is seen to be of the New Right.

Economic liberalism is also called economic rationalism in Australia. The term economic rationalism was first used by Labor's Gough Whitlam. to describe a market-oriented form of social democracy, but its meaning subsequently evolved. It is a philosophy which tends to advocate a free market economy, increased deregulation, privatisation, lower direct taxation and higher indirect taxation, and a reduction of the size of the welfare state. The politicians favouring New Right ideology were referred to as dries, while those advocating continuation of the economic policies of the post-war consensus, typically Keynesian economics, or were more socially liberal, were called wets (the term wets was similarly used in Britain to refer to those Conservatives who opposed Thatcherite economic policies, but dries in this context was much rarer in British usage).

Brazil
The New Right in Brazil has grown sharply in recent years within population, intelligentsia, and academia. That is mainly due to a generalized discontent with the  left-wing government and its policies.

This new movement distinguishes itself from what is known in Brazil as old right, which was ideologically associated to the Brazilian military government, União Democrática Nacional (National Democratic Union), and Integralism. It is identified by positive views regarding democracy, personal freedom, free-market capitalism, reduction of bureaucracy, privatization of state-run companies, tax cuts, parliamentary, political reform. It rejects "cultural Marxism", modern socialism and populism.

There have been two major phenomena relating to the rise of the new Brazilian right: the Free Brazil Movement, which has managed to bring together millions of people on demonstrations against the government in March 2015; and the creation of the New Party (Partido Novo) and Libertários, the first liberal party since the First Brazilian Republic.

Some Brazilian new-right thinkers are: Kim Kataguiri, and his movement Movimento Brasil Livre (Free Brazil Moviment), Roberto Campos, Wilson Martins, Olavo de Carvalho, Luiz Felipe Pondé, Paulo Francis, José Guilherme Merquior, Bruno Tolentino, and Miguel Reale.

As a result of this movement, in the 2018 Brazilian election, Jair Messias Bolsonaro was elected President of Brazil with 55% of the votes; his Minister of the Economy, Paulo Guedes, graduated from the University of Chicago, famous for its economically liberal school of economics.

Chile
The term New Right (Spanish: Nueva derecha) has come into mainstream political discourse since the election of Sebastián Piñera in 2010, when interior minister Rodrigo Hinzpeter used it to describe his government. Hinzpeter's introduction of the term caused a buzz among newspapers, politicians and analysts. According to a column published in The Clinic, the New Right is different from the old dictatorial right of Augusto Pinochet, in the sense that it embraces democracy. It is also different from the religiously conservative Unión Demócrata Independiente party, in that it is more open to discussing issues like divorce. According to the same analysis, the New Right is becoming increasingly pragmatic, as shown by their decision to increase taxes following the 2010 Chilean earthquake.

France

In France, the New Right (or Nouvelle Droite) has been used as a term to describe a modern think-tank of French political philosophers and intellectuals led by Alain de Benoist. Another noted intellectual, who was once part of Alain de Benoist's GRECE, is Guillaume Faye. Although accused by some critics as being "far-right" in their beliefs, they themselves claim that their ideas transcend the traditional left–right divide and actively encourages free debate. France also has one Identitarian New Right group (which is connected with Thule Seminar in Germany); that is Terre et Peuple of Pierre Vial, who was once an integral part and founding member of Alain de Benoist's GRECE.

Germany

In Germany, the Neue Rechte (literally, new right) consists of two parts: the Jungkonservative (literally, young conservatives), who search for followers in the civic part of the population; and, secondly, the "Nationalrevolutionäre" (national revolutionists), who are looking for followers in the ultra-right part of the German population, and use the rhetoric of right-wing politicians such as Gregor and Otto Strasser. Another noted New Right group in Germany is Thule Seminar of Pierre Krebs.

Greece
Failos Kranidiotis, a Greek politician who had been expelled by New Democracy chairman Kyriakos Mitsotakis for expressing views similar to those of political rival Golden Dawn, founded the New Right party, based on national liberalism, in May 2016. His views diverged from those of former Prime Minister of Greece Konstantinos Mitsotakis, whose legacy expressed the most important principle of its recently elected leadership, including Adonis Georgiadis, who had been a member only since leaving far-right Popular Orthodox Rally in 2012.

Iran
In Iran, New Right and the term Modern Right is associated with the Executives of Construction Party, which has split from the traditional Right.

Israel
New Right is a right-wing political party in Israel, founded in 2018 and led by Ayelet Shaked and Naftali Bennett. The party aims to be a party open to both secular and religious people. The party advocates the preservation of a strong right-wing in Israel.

Netherlands
The New Right (NR) was the name of a far-right/nationalist political party in the Netherlands from 2003 to 2007.  The Party for Freedom (PVV), founded in 2005 and led by Geert Wilders, also is a New Right movement. Since March 2017, Forum voor Democratie is another New Right party in the Dutch parliament.

New Zealand
In New Zealand, as in Australia, it was the Labour Party that initially adopted New Right economic policies. Rogernomics involved monetarist approaches to controlling inflation, corporatisation of government departments, and the removal of tariffs and subsidies, while the party also pursued social liberal stances such as decriminalisation of male homosexuality, pay equity for women and adopting a nuclear-free policy. This meant temporary realignment within New Zealand politics, as New Right middle-class voters voted Labour at the 1987 New Zealand general election in approval of its economic policies. At first, Labour corporatised many former government departments and state assets, then emulated the Conservative Thatcher administration and privatised them altogether during Labour's second term of office. However, recession and privatisation together led to increasing strains within the Labour Party, which led to schism, and the exit of Jim Anderton and his NewLabour Party, which later formed part of the Alliance Party with the Greens and other opponents of New Right economics.

However, dissent and schism were not to be limited to the Labour Party and Alliance Party alone. During the Labour Party's second term in office, the Opposition New Zealand National Party (popularly known as National) selected Ruth Richardson as Opposition finance spokesperson, and when National won the 1990 general election, Richardson became Minister of Finance, while Jenny Shipley became Minister of Social Welfare. Richardson introduced deunionisation legislation, known as the Employment Contracts Act, in 1991, while Shipley presided over social welfare benefit cuts, designed to reduce welfare dependency – both core New Right policy initiatives.

In the early 1990s, maverick National Party MP Winston Peters also came to oppose New Right economic policies, and led his elderly voting bloc out of the National Party. As a result, his New Zealand First anti-monetarist party has been a partner in coalition governments led by both National (1996–98) and Labour (2005–08 and 2017–20). Due to the introduction of the MMP electoral system, a New Right "Association of Consumers and Taxpayers" party, known as ACT New Zealand, was formed by ex-Labour New Right–aligned Cabinet Ministers like Richard Prebble and others, and maintaining existing New Right policy initiatives such as the Employment Contracts Act, while also introducing U.S.-style welfare reform. ACT New Zealand aspired to become National's centre-right coalition partner, but has been hampered by lack of party unity and populist leadership that often lacked strategic direction.

As for Labour and National themselves, their fortunes have been mixed. Labour was out of office for most of the nineties, only regaining power when Helen Clark led it to victory and a Labour/Alliance coalition and centre-left government (1999–2002). However, the Alliance disintegrated in 2002. National was defeated in 1999 due to the absence of a suitable stable coalition partner, given New Zealand First's partial disintegration after Winston Peters abandoned the prior National-led coalition. When Bill English became leader of National in 2001, it was thought that he might lead the party away from its prior hardline New Right economic and social policies, but his indecisiveness and lack of firm policy direction led to ACT New Zealand gaining the New Right middle-class voting basis in 2002. When Don Brash became leader, New Right middle-class voters returned to National's fold, causing National's revival in fortunes at the 2005 New Zealand general election. However, at the same time, ACT New Zealand strongly criticised it for deviating from its former New Right economic policy perspectives, and at the same election, National did little to enable ACT's survival. Don Brash resigned as National party leader, being replaced by John Key, who was a more moderate National MP.

As for the centre-left, Helen Clark and her Labour-led coalition were criticised by ex-Alliance members and non-government organisations for their alleged lack of attention to centre-left social policies, while trade union membership recovered due to Labour's repeal of the Employment Contracts Act 1991 and labour market deregulation and the deunionisation that had accompanied it in the nineties. It is plausible that Clark and her Cabinet were influenced by Tony Blair and his British Labour Government, which pursued a similar balancing act between social and fiscal responsibility while in government.

Poland
In Poland, a conservative libertarian and eurosceptic political party Congress of the New Right (New Right) was founded on 25 March 2011 from former political parties Freedom and Lawfulness (WiP) and Real Politics Union (UPR) by Janusz Korwin-Mikke. It is backed up by various voters, some conservatives, far left people who want to legalize marijuana and citizens who endorse free market and capitalism .

South Korea 
In South Korea, the South Korean New Right movement is a Korean attempt at neoconservative politics. The Lee Myung-bak government led by President Lee Myung-bak and the conservative Grand National Party is noted for being a benefactor of the domestic New Right movement.

United Kingdom

In the United Kingdom, the term New Right more specifically refers to a strand of Conservatism that Margaret Thatcher and Ronald Reagan influenced. Thatcher's style of New Right ideology, known as Thatcherism, was heavily influenced by the work of Friedrich Hayek (in particular the book The Road to Serfdom). They were ideologically committed to economic liberalism as well as being socially conservative.

United States

In the United States, New Right refers to two historically distinct conservative political movements. These American New Rights are distinct from and opposed to the more moderate tradition of the so-called Rockefeller Republicans. The New Right also differs from the Old Right (1933–55) on issues concerning foreign policy with neoconservatives being opposed to the non-interventionism of the Old Right.

First New Right 
The first New Right (1955–64) was centered on the right-wing libertarians, traditionalists, and anti-communists at William F. Buckley's National Review. Sociologists and journalists had used new right since the 1950s; it was first used as self-identification in 1962 by the student activist group Young Americans for Freedom.

The first New Right embraced what it called "fusionism" (an ostensible synthesis of classical liberal economics, traditional social values, and anti-communism) and coalesced in the years preceding the 1964 presidential campaign of Barry Goldwater. The Goldwater campaign, which failed to unseat incumbent President Lyndon B. Johnson, hastened the formation of a new political movement.

First New Right figures:
 William F. Buckley Jr., editor of National Review
 James Burnham, anti-communist political theorist
 M. Stanton Evans, journalist and author of Young Americans for Freedom's Sharon Statement
 Barry Goldwater, U.S. Senator from Arizona and Republican U.S. presidential candidate
 Frank Meyer, anti-communist libertarian and creator of the "fusionist" political theory

Second New Right 
The second New Right (1964 to present) was formed in the wake of the Goldwater campaign and had a more populist tone than the first New Right. The second New Right tended to focus on wedge issues (such as abortion) and was often linked with the Religious Right. The second New Right formed a policy approach and electoral apparatus that brought Ronald Reagan into the White House in the 1980 presidential election. The New Right was organized in the American Enterprise Institute and The Heritage Foundation to counter the so-called "liberal establishment", which they viewed as a contributor to corruption and mismanagement of the federal government. In elite think tanks and local community organizations alike, new policies, marketing strategies, and electoral strategies were crafted over the succeeding decades to promote strongly conservative policies. The second New Right objected to a perceived decline in morality, including increased drug use, more public and open displays of sexuality, rising crime rates, race riots and unrest from civil rights protesters, and Vietnam War protesters.

Second New Right figures:
 George H. W. Bush, 41st president of the United States, U.S. Ambassador to the United Nations, Director of Central Intelligence, businessman, humanitarian 
 George W. Bush, 43rd president of the United States
 Terry Dolan, founder of the National Conservative Political Action Committee
 Jerry Falwell, Southern Baptist minister, founder of Liberty University and Moral Majority
 Newt Gingrich, former Congressman, Speaker of the House, candidate for the Presidency of the United States, author
 Robert Grant, Christian right activist and founder of Christian Voice
 Rush Limbaugh, nationally syndicated talk radio and former cable news host, author
 Milton Friedman, neoclassical economist of the Chicago school of economics, recipient of the 1976 Nobel Memorial Prize in Economic Sciences
 Howard Phillips, founder of The Conservative Caucus
 Ronald Reagan, 40th president of the United States, actor, 33rd governor of California, union leader
 Phyllis Schlafly, anti-feminist activist and founder of the Eagle Forum
 Richard Viguerie, direct mail activist
 Paul Weyrich, founder of The Heritage Foundation and the Free Congress Research and Education Foundation

See also
 Neoconservatism
 New Left
 Old Right (United States)
 One-nation conservatism

References

Further reading
 Andrews, Geoff; Cockett, Richard; Hooper, Alan; Williams, Michael (1999): New Left, New Right and Beyond. Taking the Sixties Seriously. Palgrave Macmillan. 
 Arin, Kubilay Yado (2013): Think Tanks, the Brain Trusts of US Foreign Policy. Wiesbaden: VS Springer 
 Betz, Hans-George. (1993) "The new politics of resentment: radical right-wing populist parties in Western Europe." Comparative politics (1993): 413–427.  online 
 Cunningham, Sean P. (2010). Cowboy Conservatism: Texas and the Rise of the Modern Right 
 Klatch, Rebecca E. (1999) A generation divided: The new left, the new right, and the 1960s  (Univ of California Press, 1999). 
 Lyons, Paul. (1996) New left, new right, and the legacy of the sixties (Temple University Press, 1996). 
 Minkenberg, Michael.  (1992) "The new right in Germany: The transformation of conservatism and the extreme right." European Journal of Political Research 22.1 (1992): 55–81.
 Richards, David; Smith, Martin J. (2002). Governance and Public Policy in the UK.  New York: Oxford University Press. pp. 92–121. 
 Murray, Charles (1984). Losing Ground: American Social Policy, 1950–1980 
 Murray, Charles (1999). The Underclass Revisited 
 

 Wink, Georg (2021): Brazil, Land of the Past: The Ideological Roots of the New Right. Cuernavaca, Mexico: Bibliotopía.

External links 
 Free Speech Project, various New Right texts in English

 
Conservatism
Conservatism in Canada
Conservatism in Europe
Conservatism in Russia
Far-right politics
Far-right politics in Europe
Far-right politics in Russia
 01
Political movements
Political movements in Europe
Political movements in Russia
Political movements in the United States
Republican Party (United States)
Right-wing politics